Osprey Reef is a submerged atoll in the Coral Sea, northeast of Queensland, Australia. It is part of the Northwestern Group of the Coral Sea Islands.

The reef sits atop a seamount in deep water. Schindleria brevipinguis, one of the world's smallest fish, is found in the Osprey Reef lagoon.

The reef has no intertidal or emerged sand cay. The surrounding waters are part of the South Equatorial Current. The reef is protected within the Coral Sea Commonwealth Marine Reserve.

Corals
Relict fauna communities consisting of rock sponges, glass sponges, brachiopods and stalked sea lilies were discovered.

Diving
The reef has been described as the "ultimate reef diving adventure".  The reef is home to large and colourful soft corals. Sharks are common.

See also

List of reefs

References

External links

Coral Sea Islands
Coral reefs of Australia
Seamounts of the Pacific Ocean
Underwater diving sites in Australia